Joseph Luc Alfred Savoie (July 8, 1924 – April 19, 1969) was a Canadian politician. He served in the Legislative Assembly of New Brunswick from 1967 to 1969 as a member of the Liberal party.

References

1924 births
1969 deaths